Hong Gil-Soon is a former international table tennis player from North Korea.

Table tennis career
She won a silver medal at the 1979 World Table Tennis Championships in the Corbillon Cup (women's team event) with Li Song Suk, Pak Yong-Ok and Pak Yung-Sun for North Korea.

See also
 List of World Table Tennis Championships medalists

References

North Korean female table tennis players
World Table Tennis Championships medalists
Living people
Year of birth missing (living people)